Mesta AS is a Norwegian government enterprise delivering services within construction and civil engineering of roads.  The company is owned by the Norwegian Ministry of Trade and Industry and has its headquarters at Lysaker outside Oslo. Marianne Bergmann Røren is the Chief Executive Officer of Mesta AS.  

The company was created in 2003 when the construction division of Statens Vegvesen was demerged to become a separate limited company that has to compete for each contract. During the summer of 2008 the company experienced a restructuring of the entire organizational structure. The company now consists of eight fully owned subsidiaries: Geo Survey, Eiendom (Property), Entreprenør (Entrepreneur), Asfalt (Asphalt), Stein (Rock), Elektro (Electro), Drift (Operation), and Verksted (Maintenance). The corporate HQ is positioned in Oslo.

References

Construction and civil engineering companies of Norway
Government-owned companies of Norway
Companies based in Bærum
Norwegian companies established in 2003
Construction and civil engineering companies established in 2003